Out There  is a progressive rock album released in 2003 by former Yes keyboardist Rick Wakeman. The album features a new version of The English Rock Ensemble.

Track listing
"Out There"
"The Mission"
"To Be with You"
"Universe of Sound"
"Music of Love"
"The Cathedral of the Sky"

US reissue bonus tracks
 "To Be with You (single edit)"
"The Mission (single edit)"
"Music of Love (single edit)"

Personnel

Rick Wakeman - keyboards
Fraser T Smith - guitars
Tony Fernandez - drums & percussion
Damian Wilson - vocals
Ant Glynne - guitars
Lee Pomeroy - bass
English Chamber Choir - choir
Guy Protheroe - conductor

Trivia

The album is dedicated to the astronauts who gave their lives on the Columbia space mission.
The cover was designed by Italian artist Alina Bencini, who was Wakeman's girlfriend at the time.

References

Rick Wakeman albums
Concept albums
2003 albums